Francesca Rose Connolly (born 23 November 1989) is a singer from Helmshore, England. She was a member of the groups Mini Viva, who had a No. 7 hit with "Left My Heart in Tokyo", and M.O, with whom she had a No. 18 hit with "Who Do You Think Of?".

Discography

With Mini Viva
Extended plays

Singles

With M.O
Extended plays

Singles

Tours
As supporting act
 2009: The Saturdays – The Work Tour 
 2009: Cascada – Clubland Live Tour #3
 2010: Diversity – UK tour

Filmography

Awards and nominations

References

English women pop singers
Living people
People from the Borough of Rossendale
1989 births